Someday Soon or Some Day Soon may refer to:

 "Someday Soon" (Ian Tyson song), also recorded by Judy Collins, Moe Bandy and Suzy Bogguss
 "Someday Soon" (Natalie Bassingthwaighte song)
 "Someday Soon", a song by Crosby, Stills, Nash & Young from Looking Forward
 "Someday Soon", a song by Doves from Some Cities
 "Someday Soon", a song by Great Big Sea, from Great Big Sea
 "Someday Soon", a song by Journey from Departure
 "Someday Soon", a song by KT Tunstall from Drastic Fantastic
 "Someday Soon", a song by Wilco from Being There
 Some Day Soon, a 2004 album by Kristian Leontiou
 "Some Day Soon", a song by Alexi Murdoch from Towards The Sun